Strawson is a surname. People with the surname include:

Galen Strawson (born 1952), English philosopher and literary critic
John Strawson, British writer and academic
John Strawson (British Army officer) (born 1921), British Army general
P. F. Strawson (1919–2006), English philosopher